The Agence d'Information d'Afrique Centrale (ADIAC) is a private news agency established in 1997 in the Republic of the Congo. ADIAC has headquarters in Brazzaville, and is run by Jean-Paul Pigasse.

ADIAC publishes a newspaper, Les Dépêches de Brazzaville. Originally published monthly, as demand grew it was published at greater frequency. In 2007 it became the first daily newspaper in the Republic of the Congo. In 2017 ADIAC launched a second daily newspaper, Le Courrier de Kinshasa, in the Democratic Republic of the Congo.

References

News agencies based in the Republic of the Congo
1997 establishments in the Republic of the Congo
Mass media companies established in 1997